Estádio da Matola is a multi-purpose stadium in Maputo, Mozambique.  It is currently used mostly for football matches and is the home stadium of Atlético Muçulmano da Matola.  The stadium holds 3,000 people.

Matola
Multi-purpose stadiums in Mozambique
Buildings and structures in Maputo
Sport in Maputo